Halvard Hanevold (3 December 1969 – 3 September 2019) was a Norwegian biathlete.

Career

Hanevold won medals in biathlon events at the 1998 Winter Olympics and the 2002 Winter Olympics by winning his first Olympic gold followed by another gold four years later. He won the bronze medal in the men's 20 km individual and the silver medal in the men's 10 km sprint at the 2006 Winter Olympics. He won the last medal of his Olympic career in the 4 × 7.5 km relay at the Vancouver 2010 Winter Olympics.

Hanevold participated in 16 World Championships from 1994 to 2009. He was a part of the team in 1993 in Borovets as a reserve, but did not participate in any races. 
 
In his career, he recorded 40 podiums at World Cup level, with the last podium being in the final race of his final season.

Hanevold retired after the 2009–10 season.

He was a close friend to Swedish biathlete Björn Ferry.

Death
Hanevold died on 3 September 2019 at the age of 49 in his home in Asker, Akershus.

Biathlon results
All results are sourced from the International Biathlon Union.

Olympic Winter Games
6 medals (3 gold, 2 silver, 1 bronze)

*Pursuit was added as an event in 2002, with mass start being added in 2006.

World Championships
16 medals (5 gold, 7 silver, 4 bronze)

*During Olympic seasons competitions are only held for those events not included in the Olympic program.
**Team was removed as an event in 1998, and pursuit was added in 1997 with mass start being added in 1999 and the mixed relay in 2005.

Individual victories
9 victories (4 In, 2 Sp, 1 Pu, 2 MS)

*Results are from UIPMB and IBU races which include the Biathlon World Cup, Biathlon World Championships and the Winter Olympic Games.

References

External links
 
 
 
 

1969 births
2019 deaths
People from Asker
Norwegian male biathletes
Biathletes at the 1994 Winter Olympics
Biathletes at the 1998 Winter Olympics
Biathletes at the 2002 Winter Olympics
Biathletes at the 2006 Winter Olympics
Biathletes at the 2010 Winter Olympics
Olympic biathletes of Norway
Medalists at the 1998 Winter Olympics
Medalists at the 2002 Winter Olympics
Medalists at the 2006 Winter Olympics
Medalists at the 2010 Winter Olympics
Olympic medalists in biathlon
Olympic bronze medalists for Norway
Olympic silver medalists for Norway
Olympic gold medalists for Norway
Biathlon World Championships medalists
Holmenkollen Ski Festival winners
Sportspeople from Viken (county)